António Vieira (1608–1697) was a Portuguese Jesuit philosopher and writer.

Antonio Vieira may also refer to:
 Antonio de Vieira or Anton de Vieira (1682?–1745), Russian administrator of Portuguese origin
 António Vieira (Portuguese footballer) (1912–?), Portuguese footballer
 Antonio Carlos Vieira (born 1956), former Brazilian football player and manager
 Antônio Vieira (football manager), Brazilian football coach